"Boy from School" (album version titled "And I Was a Boy from School") is a song by English indietronica band Hot Chip. It was released on 8 May 2006 in the UK as the second single from their second studio album, The Warning (2006). The original title of the song was shortened for the single release on the request of EMI. The song was covered by Portastatic in 2006, Maritime in 2007, Grizzly Bear in 2010 and Tears For Fears in 2013.

Music video
Two reviews made comparisons of the video to children's craft TV programme Art Attack. Boomkat.com said "for anyone who was raised on a diet of Neil Buchanan", that the video would bring back the memory of giant Art Attacks, and This Is Fake DIY said, "They've gone all Neil Buchanan on us".

When asked about the Art Attack style video by Jonson Walker of Gigwise, Alexis Taylor said, "Yeah the video was fucking expensive! We actually said that we weren't going to spend that kind of money again unless we were blowing up cars but we'll learn."

Critical reception
Drowned in Sound compared "Boy from School" to "Over and Over" and said the song had retained the "incessant, thumping kick drum and the choral harmonies" but had incorporated differences. Drowned in Sound also said the "synths drop out to leave behind the introspective sighs of 'We try but we don't belong' [adding] a human touch to a genre led by the robotic likes of Daft Punk", a quality that might "prove to be Hot Chip's trump card." Virgin Media described the song as a "bittersweet electro gem" with "achingly gorgeous vocal harmonies that run throughout, occasionally blossoming into a reverb-treated chorus that feels like sinking back onto a bed of marshmallow".

Boomkat.com described the song, "Boy from School (Cosmic Sandwich Remix)", as having an increased tempo with rougher edges, that "chases out the lyrics" and described "Boy from School (Erol Alkan's Rework)", as being given "a dusting of disco powder".

NME said the song "fuses the thudding robots-take-Ibiza beat of Stardust's "Music Sounds Better with You" to the melancholy synth swoon of Aphex Twin's Selected Ambient Works Vol. 2, whilst MusicOMH said the song "fuses a similar folk lullaby approach to the disco drive of Spiller's "Groovejet" ". MusicOMH also said the song was "poptastically lovely", with male-female vocal harmonies, which were compared to Scritti Politti and Mojave 3, and said that the drums and keyboard take the song "in the direction of Giorgio Moroder and Kraftwerk."

The song was listed at number 29 on Pitchfork's top 500 songs of the 2000s.

The song appeared in The Simpsons episode "A Totally Fun Thing That Bart Will Never Do Again". The song was featured in various Toonami commercials in Europe.

Track listing
CD 1:
"Boy from School" – 5:20
"Boy from School" (Hot Chip Rework) – 7:10
"A Glue Too Thick" – 3:13
"Boy from School (Erol Alkan's Rework)" – 10:18
"The Bell Ringers" – 5:37
"Boy from School (Cosmic Sandwich Remix)" – 8:33

CD 2:
"Boy From School"
"Law Of Salvation"
"Boy From School" (Erol Alkan's Rework).
"Boy From School" (Video).

Personnel
Erol Alkan – reworking
Owen Clarke – art direction, design
Tom Elmhirst – mixing
Bevis Martin – artwork
Matt Paul – assistant engineer
Richard Wilkinson – engineer

Charts

References

2006 singles
2006 songs
Astralwerks singles
EMI Records singles
Hot Chip songs
Songs written by Alexis Taylor
Songs written by Joe Goddard (musician)